James Sullivan (born 19 April 1978), is a British television screenwriter. He is best known for writing seven episodes of The Green Green Grass.

Family
Jim’s father, John Sullivan, was the writer and creator of Citizen Smith (1977-1980) before creating his more notable work Only Fools and Horses (1981-2003).

Career
Sullivan wrote seven episodes for his late father's Only Fools and Horses spin-off, The Green Green Grass.

Sullivan helped write the Only Fools and Horses Sport Relief special in 2014 alongside his brother Dan Sullivan by incorporating some of their late father's old notes and bits of dialogue for the show that he never found a place for.

Sullivan wrote He Who Dares..., a fictional autobiography, that was released by Ebury Press in October 2015.

Sullivan, alongside Rod Green, also wrote Only Fools and Horses: The Peckham Archives, that was released by Ebury Press in October 2016.

Sullivan announced in July 2018 that he had written You Know It Makes Sense, Lessons from the Derek Trotter School of Business (and life). It was released by Ebury Press in November 2018.

Sullivan announced in July 2018 that he and Paul Whitehouse had written Only Fools and Horses The Musical, which launched on 9 February 2019 at the Theatre Royal Haymarket, London.

Works
The Green Green Grass (2006-2009)
Only Fools and Horses Sport Relief special (2014)
Only Fools and Horses The Musical (2019)

References

External links

21st-century English writers
English people of Irish descent
English television writers
Living people
Place of birth missing (living people)
English male writers
British male television writers
21st-century British screenwriters
1978 births